Almost Never may refer to:

 Almost Never (album), a 1992 album by Biota
 Almost Never (TV series), a British musical dramedy series
 Almost never, a term of probability theory